Neoxaline is a bio-active Aspergillus japonicus isolate. It is an antimitotic agent and shows weak inhibitory activity of blood platelet aggregation induced by simulation of the central nervous system. It has been synthesized through the "highly stereoselective introduction of a reverse prenyl group to create a quaternary carbon stereocenter using (−)-3a-hydroxyfuroindoline as a building block, construction of the indoline spiroaminal via cautious stepwise oxidations with cyclizations from the indoline, assembly of (Z)-dehydrohistidine, and photoisomerization of unnatural (Z)-neoxaline to the natural (E)-neoxaline."

See also
Satoshi Ōmura

References

Piperidine alkaloids
Pyrrolidine alkaloids
Mitotic inhibitors